Zoya Alexeevna Douchine, sometimes written Zoja Duschin, married surname Barkenstein (born 24 October 1983) is a German former competitive figure skater. The 2000 national silver medalist, she represented Germany at the 2000 European Championships, placing 18th, and at the 2000 World Championships, where she finished 17th. She began skating while still living in Moscow. She and her family moved to Germany in 1991. She retired from competitive skating in 2003 due to injury.

Programs

Competitive highlights
GP: Grand Prix; JGP: Junior Series/Junior Grand Prix

References

External links

 

German female single skaters
1983 births
Living people
Russian emigrants to Germany
Sportspeople from Munich